What's the Use of Grumbling is a 1918 British silent drama film directed by Henry Edwards and starring Basil Gill, Gwynne Herbert and Chrissie White. It was produced by Cecil Hepworth for the British Ministry of Information as propaganda during the First World War.

Cast
 Basil Gill as The Man
 Gwynne Herbert as The Woman
 Chrissie White as The Girl

References

External links

1918 films
British silent short films
1918 drama films
Films directed by Henry Edwards
British drama films
British black-and-white films
1910s English-language films
1910s British films
Silent drama films